Wyatt Coleman, also known as Wyldfyer is an American music producer. He produced a promo album (from Jay-Z), The Black Album: Classik. He produced tracks for Nas's "Hip Hop Is Dead", and the collaboration between Nas and Jay-Z,  "Black Republican".

After producing the Nas hit "War is Necessary" which appears in the video game, Grand Theft Auto IV, Wyldfyer collaborated with Ludacris and Lil Wayne.

Production discography

Interviews
Tres Leches Radio- The Main Ingredient (With Music Producer Wyldfyer bit.ly/TLRWyld http://illroots.com/2007/04/09/featured-wyldfyre-2/ illRoots.com Interview with Wyldfyer]

http://blog.istandardproducers.com/2011/10/wyldfire2/

References

Living people
Year of birth missing (living people)
Writers from Atlanta
Writers from Philadelphia
East Coast hip hop musicians
American hip hop record producers
Musicians from Philadelphia
African-American record producers
21st-century American musicians
Record producers from Pennsylvania
21st-century African-American musicians